This is a list of stadtholders or governors in the historical Netherlands region. This includes all the territories in the Low Countries that in the mid-16th-century were part of the Habsburg Netherlands, and then known as the "Seventeen Provinces". It excludes territories which were never owned by the House of Habsburg, such as the Prince-Bishopric of Liège (until 1794), the Princely Abbey of Stavelot-Malmedy (until 1794), the Prince-Bishopric of Cambrésis and the Imperial City of Cambray (until 1678), the Principality of Sedan (until 1651), the Duchy of Bouillon (until 1795), and the Duchy of Jülich (until 1795).

Background 
The stadtholders or governors were appointed from the ranks of the high nobility, and acted as deputies of a monarch, such as the dukes of Burgundy, Saxony and Guelders, the kings of Spain, or the archdukes of Austria. During the Eighty Years' War, the States(-General) of provinces which rebelled against the Spanish crown started appointing their own stadtholders, establishing a symbiotic relationship between States and stadtholders in what would become the Dutch Republic. Throughout the war, some areas had two stadtholders: those appointed by the Habsburgs, and those appointed by the States in revolt.

By county, duchy, and lordship

County of Artois 
The County of Artois was a province of France, held by the Dukes of Burgundy from 1384 until 1477/82, and a state of the Holy Roman Empire from 1493 until 1659. Through the Burgundian treaty of 1548, it was made part of the Habsburg Netherlands (Seventeen Provinces) until 1659, when it was reincorportated into France.

In Habsburg service:
 1500–1504: Engelbert II of Nassau, count of Nassau-Breda
 1506–1513: James II of Luxemburg-Fiennes, lord of Fiennes
 15??–1524: Ferry of Croÿ, lord van Roeulx 
 1524–1553: Adrian of Croÿ, count of Roeulx
 1553–1558: Pontus of Lalaing, lord of Bugnicourt
 1559–1568: Lamoral, Count of Egmont, prince of Gavre
 1568–1571: none (?)
 1571–1578?: Ferdinand of Lannoy, duke of Bojano
 1578–1579: Gilles van Berlaymont, lord of Hierges
 1579–1597?: Florent de Berlaymont, count of Lalaing and Berlaymont
 1597–1610: Charles III de Croÿ, prince of Chimay
 1610–1624: Lamoral, Prince of Ligne

Duchy of Brabant 
The Duchy of Brabant had no stadtholder, since the governor-general administered this region directly from Brussels. William of Orange once proposed to appoint a kind of stadtholder (he called it superintendent) to be able to persuade the States of Brabant to obey, because without the stadtholder the States could act too independently. He implied that he himself would be a good candidate for the office. However, his proposal was rejected by Granvelle. At the Entry of William of Orange to Brussels in September 1577, Orange did receive the medieval title of ruwaard from the hands of the States of Brabant, which came down to a stadtholdership, but mainly had symbolic value.

County of Drenthe 
In Habsburg service
 1536–1540: Georg Schenck van Toutenburg
 1540–1548: Maximilian of Egmont
 1549–1568: Jean de Ligne, count of Arenberg
 1568–1572: Charles de Brimeu, count of Megen
 1572–1574: Gillis of Berlaymont
 1574–1576: Caspar de Robles, lord of Billy
 1576–1580: none; province in States-General control
 1580–1581: George de Lalaing, count of Rennenberg
 1581–1594: Francisco Verdugo
 1595–1618: Frederik van den Bergh, in name only

In States-General service
 1576–1580: George de Lalaing
 1580–1584: William "the Silent" of Orange, prince of Orange (de facto)
 1584–1596: gnone; province in Spanish control
 1593/6–1620: William Louis of Nassau-Dillenburg
 1620–1625: Maurice, Prince of Orange
 1625–1632: Ernest Casimir I of Nassau-Dietz
 1632–1640: Henry Casimir I of Nassau-Dietz
 1640–1647: Frederick Henry, Prince of Orange
 1647–1650: William II, Prince of Orange
 1650–1664: William Frederick of Nassau-Dietz
 1664–1696: Henry Casimir II of Nassau-Dietz
 1696–1702: William III, Prince of Orange
 1702–1722: Second Stadtholderless Period
 1722–1751: William IV, Prince of Orange
 1751–1795: William V, Prince of Orange

County of Flanders 
In Habsburg service
 1490–1506: Engelbert II of Nassau, count of Nassau-Breda
 1506–1513: James II of Luxemburg-Fiennes, lord of Fiennes
 1513–1517: ?
 1517–1532: James II of Luxemburg-Fiennes, lord of Fiennes
 1532–1540: Stadtholderless period (office temporarily suspended due to concerns of political power)
 1540–1553: Adrian of Croÿ, count of Roeulx
 1553–1558: Pontus of Lalaing, lord of Bugnicourt
 1559–1568: Lamoral, Count of Egmont, prince of Gavre
 1568–1572: none (?)
 1572–1577: 
 1577–1584: none (?); province in States-General control (Calvinist Republic of Ghent)

In States-General service:
 1577: Philippe III de Croÿ, duke of Aarschot
 1577–1583: none (?); province in States-General control (Calvinist Republic of Ghent)
 1583–1584: Charles III de Croÿ, prince of Chimay, duke of Aarschot

Lordship of Frisia 

 1515–1518: Floris van Egmont, Count of Buren
 1518–1521: Wilhelm von Roggendorf
 1522: Jancko Douwama, Frisian rebel
 1521–1540: Georg Schenck van Tautenburg
 1548–1559: Maximiliaan van Egmond, Count of Buren
 1559–1568: Jean de Ligne, Count of Arenberg
 1568–1572: Charles de Brimeu, Count of Megen
 1572–1574: Gillis van Berlaymont, Lord of Hierges
 1574–1576: Caspar de Robles
 1576–1581: George de Lalaing, Count of Rennenberg, in the service of Phillip II
 1581–1594: Francisco Verdugo, in the service of Phillip II
 1580–1584: William I, Prince of Orange
 1584–1620: William Louis, Count of Nassau-Dillenburg
 1620–1632: Ernest Casimir I of Nassau-Dietz
 1632–1640: Henry Casimir I of Nassau-Dietz
 1640–1664: William Frederick, Prince of Nassau-Dietz
 1664–1696: Henry Casimir II of Nassau-Dietz
 1696–1711: John William Friso, Prince of Orange
 1711–1747: William IV, Prince of Orange

Lordship of Groningen 

 1519–1522: Cristoffel van Meurs
 1522–1530: 
 1530–1536: Charles of Guelders
 1536: Ludolf Coenders
 1536–1540: Georg Schenck van Toutenburg
 1540–1548: Maximiliaan van Egmond
 1549–1568: Jean de Ligne, Duke of Aremberg
 1568–1572: Charles de Brimeu
 1572–1574: Gillis van Berlaymont
 1574–1576: Caspar de Robles
 1576–1581: George de Lalaing, Count of Rennenberg
 1581–1594: Francisco Verdugo
 1584–1620: William Louis, Count of Nassau-Dillenburg
 1620–1625: Maurice, Prince of Orange
 1625–1632: Ernest Casimir I of Nassau-Dietz
 1632–1640: Henry Casimir I of Nassau-Dietz
 1640–1647: Frederick Henry, Prince of Orange
 1647–1650: William II, Prince of Orange
 1650–1664: William Frederick of Nassau-Dietz
 1664–1673: Albertine Agnes of Nassau, regentess for Hendrick Casimir II
 1664–1696: Henry Casimir II of Nassau-Dietz
 1696–1707: Henriette Amalia von Anhalt, regentess for Johan Willem Friso
 1696–1711: John William Friso, Prince of Orange
 1711–1729: Marie Louise von Hessen-Kassel, regentess for William IV
 1711–1747: William IV, Prince of Orange

Duchy of Guelders 

 1473–1475: William IV of Egmont
 1475–1476: William V of Egmont
 1474–1477: Philip I of Croÿ-Chimay
 1480–1481: William V of Egmont
 1481–1492: Adolf III of Nassau-Wiesbaden-Idstein
 1492–1504: Guelders independent
 1504–1505: John V, Count of Nassau-Siegen
 1505–1507: Philip of Burgundy
 1507–1511: Floris van Egmond
 1511–1543: Guelders independent
 1543–1544: René of Châlon
 1544–1555: Philip de Lalaing
 1555–1560: Philip de Montmorency
 1560–1572: Karel van Brimeu
 1572–1577: Gillis van Berlaymont
 1578–1581: Johann VI, Count of Nassau-Dillenburg
 1581–1585: William IV of Bergh
 1585–1587: Claude de Berlaymont
 1587–1626: Florent de Berlaymont
 1584–1589: Adolf van Nieuwenaar
 1590–1625: Maurice, Prince of Orange
 1625–1647: Frederick Henry, Prince of Orange
 1647–1650: William II, Prince of Orange
 1650–1675: First Stadtholderless Period
 1675–1702: William III, Prince of Orange
 1702–1722: Second Stadtholderless Period
 1722–1747: William IV, Prince of Orange

Upper Guelders 

 1502–1522: Reinier of Guelders
 1522–1543: Occupation by the Habsburgs
 1543–1579: No stadtholder
 1579–1589: Jan van Argenteau
 1589–1592: Marcus de Rye de la Palud
 1592–1593: Charles of Ligne
 1593–1611: Herman van den Bergh
 1611–1618: Frederik van den Bergh
 1618–1632: Hendrik van den Bergh
 1632–1637: Occupation by the Dutch Republic
 1640–1646: Willem Bette
 1646–1652: Jan Koenraard van Aubremont
 1652–1680: Filips Balthasar van Gendt
 1680–1699: Johan Frans Desideratus of Nassau-Siegen
 1699–1702: Philippe Emanuel, Prince of Hornes

County of Hainaut 

 1477–1482: Adolph of Cleves
 1482–1511: Philip I de Croÿ
 1511–1521: Charles I de Croÿ
 1521–1549: Philip II de Croÿ
 1549–1558: Charles II de Lalaing
 1558–1560: Charles de Brimeu
 1560–1566: John IV of Glymes
 1566–1574: Philip of Noircarmes
 1574–1582: Philip de Lalaing
 1582–1590: Emanuel Philibert de Lalaing
 1592–1606: Charles III de Croÿ
 1613–16: Charles Bonaventure de Longueval
 1663–1674: Philippe François de Ligne

County of Holland, Zeeland, and Utrecht 
The stadtholdership of Holland and Zealand has always been combined. Since the office was instituted there in 1528, the stadtholder of Utrecht has been the same as the one of Holland, with one exception. In 1572, William of Orange was elected as the stadtholder, although Philip II had appointed a different one.

During the First Stadtholderless Period, the provinces of Holland, Zealand and Utrecht were governed by their States free from autocratic intervention. The Second Stadtholderless Period in Holland ended when the Frisian stadtholder became hereditary stadtholder for all provinces of the Dutch Republic.

 1433–1440: Hugo van Lannoy
 1440–1445: Willem van Lalaing
 1445–1448: Gozewijn de Wilde
 1448–1462: Jean de Lannoy
 1462–1477: Loys of Gruuthuse
 1477–1480: Wolfert VI van Borselen
 1480–1483: Joost de Lalaing
 1483–1515: Jan III van Egmond
 1515–1521: Henry III of Nassau-Breda
 1522–1540: Antoon I van Lalaing
 1540–1544: René of Châlon
 1544–1546: Louis of Flanders
 1547–1558: Maximilian II of Burgundy
 1559–1567: William I, Prince of Orange
 1567–1573: Maximilien de Hénin, 3rd Count of Bossu
 1573–1574: Philip of Noircarmes
 1574–1577: Gillis van Berlaymont
 1572–1584: William I, Prince of Orange
 1584–1589: Adolf van Nieuwenaar
 1585–1625: Maurice, Prince of Orange
 1625–1647: Frederick Henry, Prince of Orange
 1647–1650: William II, Prince of Orange
 1650–1672: First Stadtholderless Period
 1672–1702: William III, Prince of Orange
 1702–1747: Second Stadtholderless Period

Duchy of Luxemburg 

 1451–1475: Antoine I de Croÿ
 –1511: Philip I de Croÿ
 1545–1552: Peter Ernst I von Mansfeld-Vorderort
 1552–1555: Maarten van Rossum
 1556–1558: Charles de Brimeu
 1559–1604: Peter Ernst I von Mansfeld-Vorderort (second time)
 1604–1626: Florent de Berlaymont
 1648–1650: Philippe François de Croy, Duke of Havré
 1654–1675: 
 1675–16: John Charles de Landas (acting)
 1680–1684: 
 1684–1686: 
 1686–1687: Louis-François de Boufflers
 1687–1690: Nicolas Catinat
 1697–1713: 
 1727–1734:

Lordship of Overijssel 

 1528–1540: Georg Schenck van Toutenburg
 1540–1548: Maximiliaan van Egmond
 1548–1568: Jean de Ligne
 1568–1572: Charles de Brimeu
 1572–1573: Gillis van Berlaymont
 1573–1576: Caspar de Robles
 1576–1581: George de Lalaing
 1581–1594: Francisco Verdugo
 1594–1618: Frederik van den Bergh
 1584–1589: Adolf van Nieuwenaar
 1590–1625: Maurice, Prince of Orange
 1625–1647: Frederick Henry, Prince of Orange
 1647–1650: William II, Prince of Orange
 1650–1675: First Stadtholderless period
 1675–1702: William III, Prince of Orange
 1702–1747: Second Stadtholderless period
 1747–1751: William IV, Prince of Orange
 1751–1795: William V, Prince of Orange

Duchy of Limburg 

 1473-1477: Guy of Brimeu, stadtholder-general
 1542-1572: Johan I of East Frisia 
 1574-1578: Arnold II Huyn van Amstenrade, Lord of Geleen and Eijsden
 1578-1579: Cristóbal de Mondragón
 1579-1597: Claude van Wittem van Beersel
 1597-1612: Gaston Spinola
 1612-1620: Maximilian of Saint-Aldegonde
 1620-1624: Charles Emanuel of Gorrevod
 1624-1626: Hermann of Burgundy
 1626-1632: Hugo of Noyelles
 1632-1635: Occupation by the Dutch
 1635-1640: Willem Bette, baron of Lede
 1640-1647: Jan van Wiltz
 1649-1665: Lancelot Schetz of Grobbendonk
 1665-1684: Johan Frans Desideratus of Nassau-Siegen, 
 1685-1702: Henri, 4th Prince of Ligne
 1702-1703: Franz Sigismund of Thurn und Taxis
 1703-1705: Ludwig von Sinzendorf
 1705-1707: Jan Peter de Goës
 1707-1709: Ferdinand Bertrand de Quiros
 1709-1710: Johann Wenzel von Gallas
 1710-1713: Frans Adolf of Sinzerling
 1713: Ludwig von Sinzendorf
 1713-1714: George of Tunderfeld
 1714-1723: Franz Sigismund of Thurn und Taxis
 1725-1728: Otto of Vehlen 
 1728-1754: Wolfgang Willem of Bournonville

Namur 
In Habsburg service:
 1429–1473: Jean II de Croÿ, lord of Chimay
 1485–1???: John III of Glymes,lord of Bergen op Zoom (fell into disgrace and had to resign)
 1503–1507: William de Croÿ, lord of Chièvres
 1509–1532: John III of Glymes, lord of Bergen op Zoom (restored to office)
 1532–1541: Anthony of Glymes, marquess of Bergen op Zoom
 1541–1545: , lord of Werchin
 1553/4–1578: Charles de Berlaymont, baron of Hierges
 1578–1579: Gilles van Berlaymont, lord of Hierges
 1579–1599?: Florent de Berlaymont, count of Lalaing and Berlaymont
 1599–16??: Charles II of Egmont
 16??–16??: Albert François de Croÿ-Roeulx, count of Megen

Tournaisis 
In Habsburg service
 1555–1556: , lord of Werchin
 1559–1570?: Floris of Montmorency, baron of Montigny
 1581–1588?: Philippe de Récourt, baron de Licques (Liques), castellan of Lens, from 1574 to 1576 governor of Cambrésis

In States-General service
 15??–1594?: Pierre de Melun, grandson of Peter van Barbançon. During the Siege of Tournai (1581) his wife Marie-Christine de Lalaing defended the city.

See also 

 List of Belgian monarchs
 List of dukes of Bouillon
 List of bishops and archbishops of Cambrai
 List of governors of the Habsburg Netherlands
 List of bishops and prince-bishops of Liège
 List of monarchs of Luxembourg
 List of monarchs of the Netherlands
 List of rulers of the Netherlands
 List of rulers of Sedan

References

Bibliography 
 

History of the Low Countries
Lists of political office-holders in the Netherlands
Political history of the Dutch Republic